Steven Broad (born 1986) is a New Zealand singer from Invercargill, who came 5th on the second season of The X Factor (New Zealand). He is mostly known for placing third on the second series of NZ Idol. He currently works for MediaWorks Canterbury.

Early life
Broad was born in Invercargill in 1986.

NZ Idol

In the second season of NZ Idol, Steve was voted 3rd place.

Pop's Ultimate Star

Broad competed on Pop's Ultimate Star, where he came in 8th place.

The X Factor

Broad attended the pre-auditions in Dunedin in October 2014 and advanced through to the judges' auditions. Broad performed "Mirrors" by Justin Timberlake at his audition and received positive feedback from all four judges. Broad performed Nick Jonas' "Jealous" at Judges Retreats. His mentor Melanie Blatt picked Broad as one of her final three acts which advanced to the live shows. With the elimination of Sarah Spicer in week 4 and Joe Irvine in week 5, Broad was the last act in the Over 25's category mentored by Melanie Blatt. After his week 8 performance of Tiki Taane's "Always On My Mind", Broad found himself for the first time in the bottom two against Stevie Tonks. Broad sang "I Lived" by OneRepublic in the final showdown against Tonks, but lost the judges vote with three of the four judges choosing to send Broad home. Broad came 5th overall.

Discography

Digital releases from The X Factor

References

New Zealand Idol participants
The X Factor (New Zealand TV series) contestants
1986 births
Living people
21st-century New Zealand male singers